LGW is the IATA airport code for London Gatwick Airport.

LGW may also refer to:
 Luftfahrtgesellschaft Walter, a German regional airline with ICAO code LGW
 Langwathby railway station, which has the UK railway station code LGW
 Laser-guided bombs, sometimes known as Laser-guided weapons (LGW)